The River Raisin is a river in southeastern Michigan, United States, that flows through glacial sediments into Lake Erie. The area today is an agricultural and industrial center of Michigan. French settlers named it as La Rivière aux Raisins because of the wild grapes growing along its banks, the French word for grape being raisin. The French term for "raisin" is raisin sec (dry grape).

History and geography
The River Raisin was used by local Potawatomi and Wyandot peoples, who had a portage between the upper river to gain access into the Grand and Kalamazoo rivers flowing west toward Lake Michigan. The river is still classified as canoeable throughout its length. But, low gradient, access issues, frequent logjams in the upper reaches, and 22 dams on the mainstream limit its recreational use. The first European settlements along the river were by French-Canadian colonists, who in the 1780s developed their traditional "ribbon" farms in Frenchtown. These had narrow fronts on the river so that more farmers would have access, with deep rectangular lots reaching back from the river. Now part of Monroe, Michigan, this area is still the most populous area along the river. The resort area of Irish Hills lies in the uppermost region of the watershed, which includes 429 lakes and ponds. The largest of these is the  Lake Columbia.

During the winter of 1813 as part of the War of 1812, the Battle of Frenchtown occurred near the river. British and Native American troops under the command of British General Henry Procter and Native American chiefs Roundhead, Walks in Water, and Split Log, were allied against a division of ill-trained Kentucky infantry and militia under command of General James Winchester. Cut off and surrounded and facing total slaughter, Winchester surrendered with British assurances of safety of the prisoners. The British and Potawatomi allies marched those who could walk to Detroit. But the next day, many of the severely wounded prisoners left in Frenchtown were killed by the Native Americans allies of the British.  

The Massacre of the River Raisin became a rallying cry ("Remember the Raisin") for Americans in the war, particularly for Kentuckians. United States troops returned in the spring to drive the British from Michigan forever. The original battlefield was preserved for years as a county park in Monroe, Michigan. It has several monuments erected to the Kentucky soldiers who died there. On October 12, 2010, the land was transferred to the federal government. By Congressional authorization, it is the only National Battlefield Park designating a battlefield of the War of 1812 - the River Raisin National Battlefield Park.

Since industrialization and intensified agriculture, the river has been polluted by industrial wastes and agricultural runoff. While cleanup efforts have mitigated some of the pollution, difficult-to-remove PCBs continue to constitute a hazardous waste. An established Area of Concern covers only  of the watershed at the mouth of the river, much of which is devoted to industrial and harbor use, including the Ford Motor Company plant, Detroit Edison Monroe powerplant, and the Port of Monroe. Environmental authorities advise people not to eat some species of fish from the river, if taken below the outlet of the Monroe Dam.

The river has many small dams to control water flow. These were erected to power the many paper mills constructed along it in the mid-1800s during the lumber boom. They are also products of Henry Ford's rural industry program.  While most of the dams are in Monroe, the most significant one is located in Dundee, Michigan. The Port of Monroe was constructed near the mouth of the river in the 1930s, as a needed infrastructure project sponsored by the President Franklin D. Roosevelt administration during the Great Depression.

Flooding along the river has three causes: heavy rains, ice dams developing during spring break-up, and on-shore winds pushing Lake Erie waters upstream. Flooding affects mostly the lowest portions of the river. By contrast on July 13, 1988, during a severe drought, a measuring station found  of water flow.

Most of the flow of the river is diverted through the Detroit Edison plant and discharged into Plum Creek. Previously it was discharged into the river, but it is now diverted to limit additional pollution of the river mouth area. The high level of industrial water use is thought to kill large numbers of fish in the intake screens and to make fish migration from the river into the Great Lakes almost impossible.

In 2013 U.S. Rep. Tim Walberg, along with the entire Michigan delegation, introduced a resolution (H. Res. 37, 113th Congress) to honor the 200th anniversary of the battles at the River Raisin.

Tributaries

In addition to the river forming from the Upper River Raisin and the South Branch River Raisin, the following streams flow into the River Raisin:
 Goose Creek
 Black Creek
 Evans Creek
 Iron Creek
 Little River Raisin
 Macon Creek
 Saline River

Islands
Sisters Island (Michigan)
Sterling Island
Strong Island (Michigan)

The Eagle Island Marsh is part of the Detroit River International Wildlife Refuge.

Flora and fauna
The River Raisin is home to "warm-water" fish including bluegill, white sucker, channel catfish, walleye, carp, white bass, black buffalo, freshwater drum and smallmouth bass. Very few fish migrate between the river and the Great Lakes because they are blocked by the seven dams in Monroe, as well as the power plant intakes. Bird species use the area as part of the migratory flyway along eastern Lake Erie; they include bald eagles, sandhill cranes, ducks and seagulls. Invasive fauna include zebra mussels and rusty crayfish. The threatened American lotus is present in Eagle Island Marsh, but it must compete with several invasive plant species in the watershed, including flowering rush, Eurasian milfoil, curlyleaf pondweed, Phragmites and purple loosestrife.

Communities

Towns along the river include:
 Tecumseh, Michigan
 Adrian, Michigan
 Blissfield, Michigan
 Clinton, Michigan
 Dundee, Michigan
 Petersburg, Michigan
 Manchester, Michigan
 Monroe, Michigan
 Deerfield, Michigan

Crossings

Source: Google Maps

Monroe
 
 Winchester Parkway
 Macomb Street
 
 Roessler Street
 

Monroe Township–Frenchtown Township–Raisinville Township
 Raisinville Road

Raisinville Township
 Ida–Maybee Road

Dundee
 
 
Summerfield Township
 Petersburg Road

Summerfield Township–Petersburg
 Railroad Street/Deerfield Road

Deerfield–Deerfield Township
 Rodesiler Highway

Blissfield
 

Palmyra Township
 Crockett Highway
 
 Deerfield Road

Palmyra Township–Raisin Township
 Academy Road

Raisin Township
 Laberdee Road
 Wilmoth Highway
 Raisin Center Highway
 Sutton Road

Raisin Township–Tecumseh
 Russell Road

Tecumseh
 
 Evans Street

Clinton Township
 Staib Road

Clinton

Manchester Township
 Allen Road
 Wilbur Road
 Austin Road

Manchester
 
 Duncan Street
 Main Street

References

External links

Raisin
Rivers of Monroe County, Michigan
Monroe, Michigan
Rivers of Lenawee County, Michigan
Rivers of Washtenaw County, Michigan
Rivers of Jackson County, Michigan
Raisin
Michigan in the War of 1812
Rivers of Hillsdale County, Michigan